Reinhold Wilhelm Buchholz (2 October 1837, Frankfurt an der Oder – 17 April 1876) was a German zoologist who made contributions in the fields of herpetology, carcinology and ichthyology.

He studied medicine at the University of Königsberg, and in 1872 became an associate professor of zoology at the University of Greifswald. In 1876 he was appointed a full professor and director of the zoological museum at Greifswald, but died soon afterwards.

In 1869–70 he participated as a scientist on the Second German North Polar Expedition, aboard the schooner Hansa. From 1872, with Anton Reichenow, he was stationed in western equatorial Africa, where he conducted zoological research in Kamerun, Gabon and Fernando Pó.

He was the taxonomic authority or co-authority of numerous zoological taxa. With naturalist Wilhelm Peters, he described the African toad genus Nectophryne as well as several herpetological species. He also has a number of species named after him; two examples being Raiamas buchholzi and Pantodon buchholzi. While in West Africa, he also collected botanical specimens, and in 1886, Adolf Engler named the plant genus Buchholzia (family Capparaceae) after him.

Buchholzbukta, a bight on the eastern coast of Spitzbergen is named in his honor.

Associated writings 
 "Anatomische Untersuchungen über den Bau der Araneiden". In: Archiv für Anatomie, Physiologie und wissenschaftliche Medizin, Jg. 1868, S. 240-255; with Leonard Landois – Anatomical studies on the construction of orb-weaver spiders.
 Bemerkungen über die Arten der Gattung "Dermaleichus" Koch., 1869 – Remarks on species within the genus Dermaleichus (a genus of crustaceans).
 "Beiträge zur Kenntniss der innerhalb der Ascidien lebenden parasitischen Crustaceen des Mittelmeeres". In: Zeitschrift für wissenschaftliche Zoologie, Band. 19. W. Engelmann, Leipzig 1869. 
 He was the author of the section on Crustacea in Die zweite deutsche Nordpolarfahrt in den Jahren 1869 und 1870; (1874).
 Land und Leute in Westafrika. Vortrag, 1876 – The land and people of West Africa.
 Über die von Professor Dr. Reinhold Buchholz in Westafrica gesammelten Fische, 1876 MB S. 244-252 mit 1 Tafel. 217. by Wilhelm Peters – On Buchholz' fish collection from West Africa.
 Reinhold Buchholz' Reisen in West-Afrika nach seinen hinterlassenen Tagebüchern und Briefen, 1880 (published by Karl Heinersdorff) – Reinhold Buchholz' journey in West Africa according to his posthumous diaries and letters.

References 

1837 births
1876 deaths
Academic staff of the University of Greifswald
People from Frankfurt (Oder)
University of Königsberg alumni
19th-century German zoologists
German carcinologists
German ichthyologists
German herpetologists
German polar explorers